Erysimum, or wallflower, is a genus of flowering plants in the cabbage family, Brassicaceae. It includes more than 150 species, both popular garden plants and many wild forms.  The genus Cheiranthus is sometimes included here in whole or in part. Erysimum has since the early 21st century been ascribed to a monogeneric cruciferous tribe, Erysimeae, characterised by sessile, stellate (star-shaped) and/or malpighiaceous (two-sided) trichomes, yellow to orange flowers and multiseeded siliques.

Morphology
Wallflowers are annuals, herbaceous perennials or sub-shrubs. The perennial species are short-lived and in cultivation treated as biennials. Most species have stems erect, somewhat winged, canescent with an indumentum of bifid hairs, usually 25 ± 53 cm × 2–3 mm in size, and t-shaped trichomes. The leaves are narrow and sessile. The lower leaves are linear to oblanceolate pinnatifid with backwardly directed lobes, acute, 50–80 mm × 0.5–3 mm. Stem leaves are linear, entire, all canescent with 2-fid hairs; 21–43 mm × 1.5–2 mm. Inflorescences are produced in racemes, with bright yellow to red or pink bilateral and hermaphrodite, hypogynous and ebracteate flowers. Flowering occurs during spring and summer. One species, Erysimum semperflorens, native to Morocco and Algeria, has white flowers. The floral pedicel ranges from 4 to 7 mm. Four free sepals somewhat saccate, light green, 5–7 mm × 1.5–2 mm.

Etymology

Distribution 
Wallflowers are native to southwest Asia, the Mediterranean, Europe, Africa (Cabo Verde), Micronesia, and North America through Costa Rica. Many wallflowers are endemic to small areas, such as:
E. etnense (Mount Etna)
E. franciscanum (north Californian coast)
E. kykkoticum (Cyprus – nearly extinct)
E. moranii (Guadalupe Island)
E. nevadense (the Sierra Nevada of Spain)
E. scoparium (the Teide volcano on Tenerife)
E. teretifolium (endangered – inland sandhills of Santa Cruz County, California)

Cultivation 
Most wallflower garden cultivars (e.g. Erysimum 'Chelsea Jacket') are derived from E. cheiri (often placed in Cheiranthus), from southern Europe. They are often attacked by fungal and bacterial disease, so they are best grown as biennials and discarded after flowering. They are also susceptible to clubroot, a disease of Brassicaceae. Growth is best in dry soils with very good drainage, and they are often grown successfully in loose wall mortar, hence the vernacular name. There is a wide range of flower color in the warm spectrum, including white, yellow, orange, red, pink, maroon, purple and brown. The flowers, appearing in spring, usually have a strong fragrance.  Wallflowers are often associated in spring bedding schemes with tulips and forget-me-nots.

The cultivar 'Bowles's Mauve' has gained the Royal Horticultural Society's Award of Garden Merit. It can become a bushy evergreen perennial in milder locations. It is strongly scented and attractive to bees.

Ecology 
Erysimum is found in a range of habitats across the northern hemisphere, and has developed diverse morphology and growth habits (herbaceous annual or perennial, and woody perennial). Different Erysimum species are used as food plants by the larvae of some Lepidoptera (butterflies and moths) species including the garden carpet (Xanthorhoe fluctuata). In addition, some species of weevils, like Ceutorhynchus chlorophanus, live inside the fruits feeding on the developing seeds. Many species of beetles, bugs and grasshoppers eat the leaves and stalks. Some mammalian herbivores, for example mule deer (Odocoileus hemionus) in North America, argali (Ovis ammon) in Mongolia, red deer (Cervus elaphus) in Central Europe, or Spanish ibex (Capra pyrenaica) in the Iberian Peninsula, feed on wallflower flowering and fruiting stalks. Erysimum crepidifolium (pale wallflower) is toxic to some generalist vertebrate herbivores.

Most wallflowers are pollinator-generalists, their flowers being visited by many different species of bees, bee flies, hoverflies, butterflies, beetles, and ants. However, there are some specialist species. For example, Erysimum scoparium is pollinated almost exclusively by Anthophora alluadii.

Defensive compounds
Like most Brassicaceae, species in the genus Erysimum produce glucosinolates as defensive compounds. However, unlike almost all other genera in the Brassicaceae, Erysimum also accumulates cardiac glycosides, another class of phytochemicals with an ecological importance in insect defense.  Cardiac glycosides specifically function to prevent insect herbivory and/or oviposition by blocking ion channel function in muscle cells.  These chemicals are toxic enough to deter generalist, and even some specialist insect herbivores. Cardiac glycoside production is widespread in Erysimum, with at least 48 species in the genus containing these compounds. Accumulation of cardiac glycosides in Erysimum crepidifolium, but not other tested species, is induced by treatment with jasmonic acid and methyl jasmonate, endogenous elicitors of chemical defenses in many plant species.   Molecular phylogenetic analysis indicates that Erysimum diversification from other Brassicaceae species that do not produce cardiac glycosides began in the Pliocene (2.33–5.2 million years ago), suggesting relatively recent evolution of cardiac glycosides as a defensive trait in this genus.

Escape from herbivory 
The evolution of novel chemical defenses in plants, such as cardenolides in the genus Erysimum, is predicted to allow escape from herbivory by specialist herbivores and expansion into new ecological niches. The crucifer-feeding specialist Pieries rapae (white cabbage butterfly) is deterred from feeding and oviposition by cardenolides in Erysimum cheiranthoides. Similarly, Anthocharis cardamines (orange tip butterfly), which oviposits on almost all crucifer species, avoids E. cheiranthoides. Erysimum asperum (western wallflower) is resistant to feeding and oviposition of Pieris napi macdunnoughii (synonym Pieris marginalis, margined white butterfly). Two crucifer-feeding beetles, Phaedon sp. and Phyllotreta sp., were deterred from feeding by cardenolides that were applied to their preferred food plants. Consistent with the hypothesis of enhanced speciation after escape from herbivory, phylogenetic studies involving 128 Erysimum species indicate diversification in Eurasia between 0.5 and 2 million years ago, and in North America between 0.7 and 1.65 million years ago.) This evolutionarily rapid expansion of the Erysimum genus has resulted in several hundred known species distributed throughout the northern hemisphere.

Ethnobotanical uses of Erysimum 
Erysimum species have a long history of use in traditional medicine. In Naturalis Historia by Pliny the Elder (~77), Erysimum is classified as a medicinal rather than a food plant. Erysimum cheiri is described as a medicinal herb in De Materia Medica by Pedanius Dioscorides (~70), which was the predominant European medical pharmacopeia for more than 1,500 years. Other medieval descriptions of medicinal herbs and their uses, including the Dispensatorium des Cordus by Valerius Cordus (1542), Bocks Kräuterbuch by Hieronymus Bock (1577), and Tabernaemontanus’ Neuw Kreuterbuch by Jacobus Theodorus Tabernaemontanus (1588), also discuss applications of E. cheiri. In traditional Chinese medicine, Erysimum cheiranthoides has been used to treat heart disease and other ailments. Although medical uses of Erysimum became uncommon in Europe after the Middle Ages, Erysimum diffusum, as well as purified erysimin and erysimoside, have been applied more recently as Ukrainian ethnobotanical treatments.

Selected species

 Erysimum allionii – Siberian wallflower
 Erysimum amasianum – Turkish wallflower
 Erysimum ammophilum
 Erysimum angustatum – Dawson wallflower
 Erysimum arenicola – Cascade wallflower
 Erysimum baeticum
 Erysimum caboverdeanum – Cabo Verde Wallflower
 Erysimum capitatum – sanddune wallflower, western wallflower
 Erysimum cazorlense, syn. Erysimum myriophyllum subsp. cazorlense
 Erysimum cheiranthoides – wormseed wallflower
 Erysimum × cheiri – wallflower
 Erysimum collinum
 Erysimum crepidifolium – pale wallflower
 Erysimum creticum – Crete wallflower
 Erysimum diffusum – diffuse wallflower
 Erysimum etnense – Mount Etna wallflower
 Erysimum franciscanum – Franciscan wallflower
 Erysimum fitzii
 Erysimum gomez-campoi
 Erysimum hedgeanum – syn. Arabidopsis erysimoides
 Erysimum inconspicuum – smallflower prairie wallflower
 Erysimum insulare
 Erysimum jugicola
 Erysimum kotschyanum – Kotschy wallflower
 Erysimum kykkoticum
 Erysimum mediohispanicum, syn. Erysimum nevadense subsp. mediohispanicum
 Erysimum menziesii
 Erysimum myriophyllum
 Erysimum nervosum
 Erysimum nevadense – Sierra Nevada wallflower
 Erysimum odoratum – smelly wallflower (syn. Erysimum pannonicum)
 Erysimum popovii
 Erysimum raulinii – Crete wallflower
 Erysimum redowskii, syn. Erysimum pallasii – Pallas' wallflower
 Erysimum repandum
 Erysimum rhaeticum – Swiss wallflower
 Erysimum scoparium – Teide wallflower
 Erysimum siliculosum
 Erysimum teretifolium – Santa Cruz wallflower, Ben Lomond wallflower

Gallery

References

External links

Evoflor, a web page on Erysimum floral evolution
Webpage of a UK collector of erysimums
Herbario del Instituto Pirenaico de Ecología, CSIC (Jaca, Aragón, Spain)
Botánica Sistemática, an open web on plants

 
Brassicaceae genera
Garden plants